Quriwayrachina or Quri Wayrachina (Quechua quri gold, wayrachina a special oven for smelting metal, "oven for smelting gold") is an archaeological site with agricultural terraces in Peru. It is situated in the Cusco Region, Anta Province.

Hiram Bingham III visited the site in April 1915, and by Paul Fejos in 1940

See also 
 Killarumiyuq
 Tampukancha
 Tarawasi
 Wat'a

References

Archaeological sites in Cusco Region
Archaeological sites in Peru